Murat Günel is a Turkish medical scientist. Dr. Murat Günel, Professor of Neurosurgery, assumed the position of chief of Neurovascular Surgery Program in January 2001. Dr. Günel is a board certified neurosurgeon and is a fellow of the American College of Surgeons. He has special interest in treating brain aneurysms and vascular malformations with special emphasis on arterio-venous malformations and cavernous malformations.

Honors & Recognition

 Honorary Doctor of Philosophy Degree, Bahcesehir University, Turkey (2010)
 Honorary Master of Arts Privatim Degree, Yale University (2010)
 Outstanding Scientific Achievement Award, Minister of Health, Turkey (2010)
 Nixdorff-German Professor, Yale University (2009)
 Outstanding Poster Award in Basic Science, 5th Annual Meeting of the AANS/CNS Section of Cerebrovascular Surgery (2002)
 Outstanding Poster Award in Basic Science, 4th Annual Meeting of the AANS/CNS Section of Cerebrovascular Surgery (2001)
 Young Investigator Award, American Epilepsy Society (1999)
 National Pfizer Scholar Award for New Faculty (1998-1999) 
 Ohse Research Award-Yale University (1996) 
 American College of Surgeons Scholarship (1994-1996) 
 Ira Goldenberg Junior Surgical Housestaff Award, Yale University (1992)

References

External links
Yale School of Medicine profile
Yale University, Biological&Biomedical Science profile

Living people
Istanbul University Faculty of Medicine alumni
Yale University faculty
Turkish neurosurgeons
1967 births